Alfred William Renall (1813 – 30 January 1902) was a 19th-century Member of Parliament in the Hutt Valley and Wairarapa, New Zealand.

He represented the Hutt Valley electorate of Hutt from 1858 to 1866 when he retired.

He had been a Mayor of Masterton (1880–81), a member of the Wellington Provincial Council (elected to the first session in 1853), and a flour-miller.

He died in Masterton aged 88, having been an invalid for the last five years and bed-ridden for two years.

References

1813 births
1902 deaths
Members of the New Zealand House of Representatives
New Zealand MPs for Hutt Valley electorates
Mayors of Masterton
19th-century New Zealand politicians
Members of the Wellington Provincial Council